Vojkan Benčić (born March 6, 1969) is a Serbian basketball coach and former player. He currently serves as a head coach for the Scotts Lakers of the Ireland National League Division 1.

Playing career 
Benčić played for the Crvena zvezda, Spartak, Vojvodina, Beobanka, and Radnički Jugopetrol of the Yugoslav League. During a stint with Beobanka he played the 1996–97 FIBA Korać Cup season. Over twelve cup games, he averaged 10.6 points, 2.6 rebounds and 3.8 assists per game. He won a national championship with Crvena zvezda in 1997–98 season. In same season with the Zvezda he played Korać Cup Finals where he lost from Italian team Riello Mash Verona. Over sixteen games in that Korać Cup season, he averaged 6.9 points, 2.6 rebounds and 1.7 assists per game. In next Korać Cup season he played for the Radnički Jugopetrol where he averaged 9.0 points, 4.0 rebounds and 3.3 assists per game over eight cup games.

In 1999, he went abroad. During next four years he played in Poland, Slovenia, Turkey, Russia and Bulgaria.

In 2003, he moved back to Belgrade where he played for the Atlas during 2003–04 ULEB Cup season. Over four cup games, he averaged 4.8 points, 2.8 rebounds and 3.3 assists per game. In December 2003, he parted ways with Atlas. Later he moved to the Spartak where he finished his professional career in the end of the 2003–04 season.

Coaching career 
After retirement, Benčić started his coaching career with the Spartak. He also coached Serbian teams Tamiš and Jagodina. During 2013–14 season, he coached the Stade Nabeulien of the Tunisian Division I League.

During summer of 2017 he signed with Killarney's team Scotts Lakers or the Ireland 2nd tier league.

Career achievements and awards
As player
 FR Yugoslav League champion: 1 (with Crvena zvezda: 1997–98)

References

External links
 Stats at basketball-reference.com
 Player Profile at FIBA Europe
 

1967 births
Living people
BC Yambol players
Guards (basketball)
KK Beobanka players
KK Jagodina coaches
KK Tamiš coaches
KK Spartak Subotica coaches
KK Crvena zvezda players
KK Spartak Subotica players
PBC Lokomotiv-Kuban players
BKK Radnički players
Serbian men's basketball players
Serbian men's basketball coaches
Serbian expatriate basketball people in Bulgaria
Serbian expatriate basketball people in Ireland
Serbian expatriate basketball people in Poland
Serbian expatriate basketball people in Russia
Serbian expatriate basketball people in Slovenia
Serbian expatriate basketball people in Tunisia
Serbian expatriate basketball people in Turkey
Basketball players from Belgrade